Väimela is a small borough in Võru Parish, Võru County in southeastern Estonia. 
Väimela is situated 5 km from Võru it is also, first mentioned in historical materials in the year 1403. Võru County Vocational Training Centre is situated in Väimela.

Photos

References

External links
Homepage of Võru County Vocational Training Centre

Boroughs and small boroughs in Estonia